The 2008 Baltic Futsal Cup was held from December 26 to 28, 2008 in Latvia. Latvia won the tournament

Standings

Matches

Awards

References

External links 
Futsal Planet

2008
2008 in Lithuanian football
2008 in Latvian football
2008 in Estonian football
International futsal competitions hosted by Latvia
2008–09 in European futsal